Bredda Hype is one of Jamaica's awarded top sound system from Saint Elizabeth Parish.

Selectors
Rohan Cowan (2014)
Hamma
Apache
Twenty Six
Collie Weed
Soldgie
Turbo
 prentice
somm
Dj Cena

References

External links
Bredda Hype vs. Ricky Trooper: Famous clash from Jamaica Star

Jamaican sound systems